The 1986 SWAC men's basketball tournament was held March 7–9, 1986, at the Mississippi Coast Coliseum in Biloxi, Mississippi.  defeated , 75–58 in the championship game. The Delta Devils received the conference's automatic bid to the 1986 NCAA tournament as No. 16 seed in the East Region.

Bracket and results

References

1985–86 Southwestern Athletic Conference men's basketball season
SWAC men's basketball tournament